A bed sheet is a rectangular piece of cloth used either singly or in a pair as bedding, which is larger in length and width than a mattress, and which is placed immediately above a mattress or bed, but below blankets and other bedding (such as comforters and bedspreads).  A bottom sheet is laid above the mattress, and may be either a flat sheet or a fitted sheet (a sheet which has been sewn with elastic or a drawstring along the hem of the top, sides and bottom of the sheet to prevent it from slipping off of the mattress). A top sheet, in the many countries where they are used, is a flat sheet, which is placed above a bottom sheet and below other bedding.

History
The term bed sheet was first used in the 15th century. Bed sheets were traditionally white and made of cotton, linen or silk, however, now various colors and patterns are used.

Styles

Bed sheets come in two main varieties: flat and fitted. A flat sheet is simply a rectangular sheet of cloth, while a fitted sheet has four corners, and sometimes two or four sides, fitted with elastic, to be used only as a bottom sheet. The fitted sheet may also be secured using a drawstring instead of elastic. The purpose of a fitted bottom sheet is to keep it from slipping off the mattress while the bed is in use. A particular way of folding and tucking while making the bed, known as "hospital corners," is sometimes used when the bottom sheet is flat rather than fitted.

Usually a flat bed sheet is overlocked around the edges to form four seams. One of the seams is wider than the other three and helps with orienting the sheet correctly on the mattress. The wider seam goes at the head end of the mattress. Sometimes the sides do not have seams, but are finished with the selvedge only. When placing a flat sheet on a bed, the manufacturer has designed the printed side to be softer, and thus it should be placed on the bed printed side "down". When folding back the covers, this also allows the printed side to show, for aesthetic purposes. When one makes a bed, the patterned or monogrammed side of the top sheet is placed facing down and then the top edge is folded towards the foot of the bed, exposing the design.

In the US and Canada, sheets are often sold in a four-piece set consisting of a fitted sheet, a flat sheet and two pillowcases. In China, a four-piece set consists of a duvet cover, two pillowcases and either a fitted or flat sheet. Fitted sheets are gaining popularity due to their ease of use. Use of good quality elastic make fitted sheets durable.

Materials

Cotton and cotton blends dominate the market, the most common blend being cotton/polyester. Cotton provides absorbency and a soft hand, while polyester adds durability and wrinkle resistance. Other common fibers used in the manufacturing of bed sheets include linen, silk, Modal and bamboo rayon, lyocell, Microtex or Microfiber, and polypropylene. Polypropylene (olefin) is a hypoallergenic spun-bound material produced at a low cost and typically used in emergency shelters or hospitals as disposable sheeting.

Construction
The quality of bed sheets is often conveyed by the thread count—the number of threads per square inch of material. In general, the higher the thread count, the softer the sheet, but the weave and type of thread may affect the "hand" of the material so that a sheet with a lower thread count may actually be softer than one with a higher count. Yarn quality also plays a part in the look and feel of sheets, as finer yarns tend to create a finer sheet fabric. The ply also plays a role in how heavy the sheet feels. Ply represents how many fibers are twisted together as the sheet is being created. A 2 ply 300 thread count sheet will feel heavier than a single ply 600 thread count sheet. 
 
The most common constructions are muslin, percale, sateen, flannel, and knitted jersey. In a plain weave the warp and weft cross each other one at a time. Sateen has multiple (usually 3–4) over threads and one under.

Cleaning 
Bedsheets should be washed about once a week, using low-temperature water and drying settings. Warm water can be used to eliminate coffee stains, urine or allergens, such as dust mites. Using fabric softeners is not recommended, as they leave behind residue that decreases the fabric's breathability.

See also
 Bed size

References

Bedding
Linens